Fredlanea kirschi is a species of beetle in the family Cerambycidae. It was described by Per Olof Christopher Aurivillius in 1923. It is known from Colombia and Peru.

References

Hemilophini
Beetles described in 1923